Some well-known place names in modern Turkey are derived from the Greek or Latin languages.

In Turkey

Outside Turkey

See also 
 List of Greek place names

Lists of place names